Mankiller may refer to:

Surname
 Mankiller, a family surname and traditional Cherokee military rank
 Wilma Mankiller, first female Chief of the Cherokee Nation
 Ostenaco (ca. 1703 – 1780), Cherokee mankiller often referred to by his rank

Media
 Man-Killer, a supervillain in the Marvel Comics universe
 Mankillers, also known as 12 Wild Women, a 1987 US film
 Mankiller (film), a 2017 film

Native American surnames